Countess of Holderness is a title normally given to the wife of the Earl of Holderness. Women who have held the title include:

Frances Darcy, Countess of Holderness (1618-1681)
Frederica Mildmay, Countess of Mértola (1687-1751)
Mary Darcy, Countess of Holderness (c.1721-1801)